Lack is a small village and townland (of 224  acres) in County Fermanagh, Northern Ireland, 5.5 km east-north-east of Ederny. It is situated in the civil parish of Magheraculmoney and the historic barony of Lurg. It had a population of 111 people (50 households) in the 2011 Census. (2001 Census: 114 people).

Places of interest 
Airtricity built a wind farm on Tappaghan Hill in the townland of Glenarn, near Lack. It was commissioned in February 2005 and yields 19.5MW of electricity, enough to power about 12,000 houses.

See also
List of towns and villages in Northern Ireland
List of townlands in County Fermanagh

References 

 A Little History of Lack
 Airtricity - Lack
 Ederney.com - Community web site for the Glendarragh Valley area/Fermanagh Erne Lakelands Tourism info

Villages in County Fermanagh
Townlands of County Fermanagh
Civil parish of Magheraculmoney